A tutelary (also tutelar) is a deity or a spirit who is a guardian, patron, or protector of a particular place, geographic feature, person, lineage, nation, culture, or occupation. The etymology of "tutelary" expresses the concept of safety and thus of guardianship.

In late Greek and Roman religion, one type of tutelary deity, the genius, functions as the personal deity or daimon of an individual from birth to death. Another form of personal tutelary spirit is the familiar spirit of European folklore.

Ancient Greece

Socrates spoke of hearing the voice of his personal spirit or daimonion:

The Greeks also thought deities guarded specific places: for instance, Athena was the patron goddess of the city of Athens.

Ancient Rome

Tutelary deities who guard and preserve a place or a person are fundamental to ancient Roman religion. The tutelary deity of a man was his Genius, that of a woman her Juno. In the Imperial era, the Genius of the Emperor was a focus of Imperial cult. An emperor might also adopt a major deity as his personal patron or tutelary, as Augustus did Apollo. Precedents for claiming the personal protection of a deity were established in the Republican era, when for instance the Roman dictator Sulla advertised the goddess Victory as his tutelary by holding public games (ludi) in her honor.

Each town or city had one or more tutelary deities, whose protection was considered particularly vital in time of war and siege. Rome itself was protected by a goddess whose name was to be kept ritually secret on pain of death (for a supposed case, see Quintus Valerius Soranus). The Capitoline Triad of Juno, Jupiter, and Minerva were also tutelaries of Rome.

The Italic towns had their own tutelary deities. Juno often had this function, as at the Latin town of Lanuvium and the Etruscan city of Veii, and was often housed in an especially grand temple on the arx (citadel) or other prominent or central location. The tutelary deity of Praeneste was Fortuna, whose oracle was renowned.

The Roman ritual of evocatio was premised on the belief that a town could be made vulnerable to military defeat if the power of its tutelary deity were diverted outside the city, perhaps by the offer of superior cult at Rome. The depiction of some goddesses such as the Magna Mater (Great Mother, or Cybele) as "tower-crowned" represents their capacity to preserve the city.

A town in the provinces might adopt a deity from within the Roman religious sphere to serve as its guardian, or syncretize its own tutelary with such; for instance, a community within the civitas of the Remi in Gaul adopted Apollo as its tutelary, and at the capital of the Remi (present-day Rheims), the tutelary was Mars Camulus.

Tutelary deities were also attached to sites of a much smaller scale, such as storerooms, crossroads, and granaries. Each Roman home had a set of protective deities: the Lar or Lares of the household or familia, whose shrine was a lararium; the Penates who guarded the storeroom (penus) of the innermost part of the house; Vesta, whose sacred site in each house was the hearth; and the Genius of the paterfamilias, the head of household. The poet Martial lists the tutelary deities who watch over various aspects of his farm. The architecture of a granary (horreum) featured niches for images of the tutelary deities, who might include the genius loci or guardian spirit of the site, Hercules, Silvanus, Fortuna Conservatrix ("Fortuna the Preserver") and in the Greek East Aphrodite and Agathe Tyche.

The Lares Compitales were the tutelary gods of a neighborhood (vicus), each of which had a compitum (shrine) devoted to these. During the Republic, the cult of local or neighborhood tutelaries sometimes became rallying points for political and social unrest.

Austronesian 
 Atua
 Hanitu
 Hyang
 Kaitiaki
 Kawas (mythology)
 Tiki

Buddhism
 Tibetan Buddhism has Yidam as a tutelary deity. Dakini is the patron of those who seek knowledge.

Chinese folk religion

Chinese folk religion, both past and present, includes myriad tutelary deities. Exceptional individuals, highly cultivated sages, and prominent ancestors can be deified and honored after death. Lord Guan is the patron of military personnel and police, while Mazu is the patron of fishermen and sailors. 
 Tu Di Gong (Earth Deity) is the tutelary deity of a locality, and each individual locality has its own Earth Deity. 
 Cheng Huang Gong (City God) is the guardian deity of individual city, worshipped by local officials and locals since imperial times.

Christianity 
A similar concept in Christianity would be the patron saint example of archangels "Michael, Gabriel, Raphael, etc." or to a lesser extent, the guardian angel.

Germanic 
 Fylgja
 Hamingja
 Landdisir
 Landvættir
 Vættir

Hinduism
In Hinduism, personal tutelary deities are known as ishta-devata, while family tutelary deities are known as Kuladevata. Gramadevata are guardian deities of villages. Devas can also be seen as tutelary. Shiva is patron of yogis and renunciants. City goddesses include:
 Mumbadevi (Mumbai)
 Sachchika (Osian)
Kuladevis include:
 Ambika (Porwad)
 Mahalakshmi
Kal Bhairava is the protector of Ujjain
Murugan is the protector of Kurinji (Hills).

Indonesian folk religion
Influenced by the religion of Islam, Indonesian people believe in jinn, particularly on the island of Java. Those jinn who adhere to the religion of Islam are generally benevolent, however, non-Muslim jinn are considered to be mischievous. Some of them guard graves. If a pilgrim approaching the grave has evil intentions, they would cause severe illness or even death.

Korean shamanism
In Korean shamanism, jangseung and sotdae were placed at the edge of villages to frighten off demons. They were also worshiped as deities. Seonangshin is the patron deity of the village in Korean tradition and was believed to embody the Seonangdang.

Meitei 

In Meitei mythology and religion (Sanamahism) of Manipur, there are various types of tutelary deities, among which Lam Lais are the most predominant ones.

Native American

Tonás, tutelary animal spirit among the Zapotec.
Totems, familial or clan spirits among the Ojibwe, can be animals.

Philippine folk religion
In Philippine animism, Diwata or Lambana are deities or spirits that inhabit sacred places like mountains and mounds and serve as guardians.
 Maria Makiling is the deity who guards Mt. Makiling.
 Maria Cacao and Maria Sinukuan.

Shinto

In Shinto, the spirits, or kami, which give life to human bodies come from nature and return to it after death. Ancestors are therefore themselves tutelaries to be worshiped.

Slavic Europe 
Some tutelary deities are known to exist in Slavic Europe, a more prominent example being that of the Leshy.

Thai religion

 Thai provincial capitals have tutelary city pillars and  palladiums. The guardian spirit of a house is known as Chao Thi (เจ้าที่) or Phra Phum (พระภูมิ). Almost every traditional household in Thailand has a miniature shrine housing this tutelary deity, known as a spirit house.

Vietnamese folk religion
In Vietnamese folk religion, Thành hoàng are gods who protect and bring good things to the village.

See also
 Dvarapala
 Ethnic religion
 Eudaemon (mythology)
 Guardian angel
 Hiisi
 Liminal deity
 Nagual
 National god
 Neoshamanism
 Patron saint
 Uay

References

 
Comparative mythology
Mythological archetypes